GBC may refer to:
Global Business Coalition

Broadcasting 
 Gibraltar Broadcasting Corporation
 Ghana Broadcasting Corporation
 Granite Broadcasting, in the United States
 Greek Business Channel, in Greece
 Guyana Broadcasting Corporation

Education 
 George Brown College, in Toronto, Ontario, Canada
 Goldey–Beacom College, in Wilmington, Delaware, United States
 Government Barisal College, in Bangladesh
 Great Basin College, in Elko, Nevada, United States

Religion 
 Garo Baptist Convention, in India and Bangladesh
 Georgia Baptist Convention, in the American state of Georgia
 Germantown Baptist Church, in Tennessee, United States

Other uses 
 Gambler's Book Shop / GBC Press, an American bookstore and publisher
 Game Boy Color, a handheld game console
 Game Boy Camera, a 1998 accessory for the Game Boy
 GBC Asset Management, a Canadian investment management firm
 Gender Balance Council, a federal entity in the United Arab Emirates
 General Binding Corporation, an American office supplies manufacturer
 Get Busy Committee, an American rap group
 Gipuzkoa Basket Club, a Spanish professional basketball club
 GothBoiClique, an American emo rap collective
 Greater Baltimore Committee, an American urban planning organization
 Green Building Council, a type of environmental organization